The Australian Women's land Army (AWLA) was an organisation created in World War II in Australia to combat rising labour shortages in the farming sector. The AWLA organised female workers to be employed by farmers to replace male workers who had joined the armed forces.

When WWII began, the only women’s unit in the Australian Army was the Australian Army Nursing Service. Within three years, women would grow their skills to meet wartime demands and register themselves for enlistment into several more auxiliary service units and dozens of voluntary groups and legions. By 1942, women’s units had been formed across all arms of the defence forces: the Women’s Australian Auxiliary Air Force (WAAAF), the Women’s Royal Australian Naval Service (WRANS), the Australian Women’s Army Service (AWAS) and the Australian Army Medical Women’s Service (AAMWS). By the end of the war, 50,000 Australian women had served in these units, with women employed in over 70 different occupations in the WAAAF alone.

History
The AWLA was formed on 27 July 1942 and was modelled on the Women's Land Army in Great Britain. It was overseen by  Lieutenant General Carl Jess. When Japan joined the Axis in 1941 male agricultural labour was recruited into the Australian military to defend the country. To meet the shortfall in rural labour, state and private women’s land organisations began to form under the jurisdiction of the Director General of Manpower. The AWLA disbanded on 31 December 1945. In 1997, many members became eligible for the Civilian Service Medal. Almost a third of women of working age would participate in paid work during WWII, many in roles unavailable to them before the war.

The minimum age for recruits was 18 with a maximum of 50 years of age. Women had to be either of British origin or immigrants from Allied nations. AWLA women were generally recruited from urban areas and were often unskilled in rural work. Members were given farming instruction and undertook work in primary industries, rather than any domestic duties at the hostels in which they were lodged in farming areas. The AWLA reached its peak enrolment in December 1943, with 2,382 permanent members and 1,039 auxiliary members. Women in the AWLA worked an average 48-hour week, with pay starting at the AWLA minimum wage of 30 shillings a week. Permanent members were also entitled to sick pay. As was common at the time, Women in the AWLA were paid much less than their male counterparts for the same work. Whether remunerated at the rate of a man (women tram conductors achieved this milestone), or at the typical rate of half or two thirds that of a man, or not paid at all, many of these women proudly demonstrated they were more than capable of doing the job that was needed. For women more comfortable with “traditional” women’s roles, there were other opportunities to work in hospitality or with fundraising and patriotic groups. Carrying on a proud tradition, women from the “Comfort Funds” knitted their way through the war, making socks, scarves and mittens, and gathering other items to package and send to the troops. Established service groups such as The Red Cross also enlisted women in new roles, including as part of the Voluntary Aid Detachment where they worked as medical orderlies.

Members of the AWLA also covered a variety of agricultural labours, including vegetable and fruit growing, pig and poultry raising, and sheep and wool work.

The AWLA was planned to function in two divisions:

 Full-time members: These enrolled for continuous service for 12 months (with the option of renewal); such members were to receive appropriate badges, distinctive dress uniform, working clothes, and equipment.
 Auxiliary members: These were available for periods of not less than four weeks at nominated times of the year; such members were to be used for seasonal rural operations, and to receive a badge, working clothes, and essential equipment on loan.
After the war, many women would find themselves relegated to the home once again, as men returned to civilian life, and society returned to a new version of the old status quo. However, the example these women set during WWII ignited a confidence in their own and subsequent generations of women that perhaps they could and would like to do more, and perhaps they even deserved to be paid equally for their efforts!

It would be a few more decades after the end of WWII, and would require the efforts of many more generations of progressive women and like-minded men, before Australian women would achieve equal pay entitlements and their employment rights would be enshrined in legislation like the Sex Discrimination Act. Even today, equal pay and women’s rights remain topical issues. But for all the battles yet to be fought, it is undeniable that the ingenuity, guts and resilience demonstrated by women during WWII impacted the course of history for the millions of Australians that followed in their footsteps.

To celebrate the 70th anniversary of the formation, the Australian Government agreed to a range of measures to recognise and thank the 'land army girls' for their commitment and efforts. A reception was held in Parliament House on Monday 20 August 2012 which acknowledged those surviving former AWLA members who were able to attend. Attendees were presented with a commemorative certificate, a commemorative brooch and a copy of a commemorative history publication of the AWLA.

For many years after the war little if any acknowledgement was given to the service provided by the AWLA. Peggy Williams OAM, a former member of the AWLA led the campaign for proper recognition of all 'land army girls' efforts during the war years. This was acknowledged in a speech given by the Prime Minister of Australia at the Parliament House reception marking the 70th anniversary.

Notable members
 Jessica Anderson
 Florence Hummerston
 Faith Bandler
 Beryl McLeish

See also
 Australian home front during World War II
 Australian Women's Army Service
 British Women's Land Army
 Female roles in the World Wars
 Victory garden
 Woman's Land Army of America
 Women's Auxiliary Australian Air Force
 Women's Royal Australian Naval Service

References

External links
 Australian Government: Women in Wartime
 Victoria: Women's Land Army
Women's History Forum
Australian War Memorial
 Women of war recognised, Senator John Faulkner
 Australian Women at Work in WWII: Keep Cool and Carry On

Groups of World War II
Land
Women in agriculture
History of agriculture in Australia